The Ministry of Foreign Affairs and International Cooperation is a cabinet ministry of Eswatini in charge of conducting and designing the foreign relations of the country.

The current Minister of Foreign Affairs and International Cooperation is Thuli Dladla.

Organization and structure

List of ministers
This is a list of Ministers of Foreign Affairs and International Cooperation of Eswatini:

1968–1970: Prince Makhosini Dlamini
1970–1971: Zonke Amos Khumalo
1971–1972: Kanyakwezwe Henry Dlamini
1972–1979: Mhlangano Stephen Matsebula
1979–1982: Lawrence Macina
1982–1984: Richard Velaphi Dlamini
1984–1986: Mhambi Mnisi
1986–1987: Shadrack J.S. Sibanyoni
1987–1993: Sir George Mbikwakhe Mamba
1993–1995: Solomon Dlamini
1995–1998: Arthur Khoza
1998–2001: Albert Nhlanhla Shabangu
2001–2003: Abednego Ntshangase
2003............ Roy Fanourakis
2003–2006: Mabili Dlamini
2006–2008: Moses Mathendele Dlamini
2008–2011: Lutfo Dlamini
2011–2013: Mtiti Fakudze
2013............ Sotsha Dlamini 
2013–2018: Mgwagwa Gamedze
2018............ Joel Musa Nhleko 
2018–present: Thuli Dladla

See also
List of diplomatic missions of Eswatini
List of diplomatic missions in Eswatini

References

Politics of Eswatini
Political organisations based in Eswatini
Foreign relations of Eswatini
Eswatini
Government of Eswatini